Wuhan Center is a skyscraper in Wuhan near Wuhan Business District Station in Jianghan District, Wuhan, Hubei, China. The skyscraper's construction started in 2011, and was completed by 2019. The tower was topped out on April 16, 2015. It is the second tallest building in Central China, and the first building in Wuhan to exceed .

See also
List of tallest buildings in China
List of tallest buildings in Wuhan

References 

China Oceanwide Holdings Group
Buildings and structures under construction in China
Skyscraper office buildings in Wuhan
Residential skyscrapers in China
Skyscraper hotels in Wuhan
Skyscrapers in Wuhan
Jianghan District